Indrek Rumma (born 14 September 1969) is an Estonian basketball player.

He was born in Tallinn. In 1987 he graduated from Estonian Sports Gymnasium (TSIK). 1989-1991 he studied at Tallinn Pedagogical Institute, and later in Estonian Business School.

His first basketball coach was Jaanus Levkoi. He has played at Kalev. 1990–2001 he was a member of Estonia men's national basketball team.

References

Living people
1969 births
Estonian men's basketball players
BC Tallinn Kalev players
Tallinn University alumni
Basketball players from Tallinn